Mlah is the debut album by Les Négresses Vertes, released in 1988.

Track listing
All songs written by Les Négresses Vertes

"La Valse"
"Zobi la Mouche"
"C'est Pas la Mer à Boire"
"Voilà l'Été"
"Orane"
"La Faim des Haricots"
"Les Yeux de Ton Père"
"Il"
"L'Homme des Marais"
"Les Rablablas les Roubliblis"
"Marcelle Ratafia"
"La Danse des Négresses Vertes"
"Hey Maria"
"Le Père Magloire"

Personnel
Helno – vocals
Mellino – vocals, guitar
Mathieu Canavese – guitar, accordion, background vocals
Paulo – guitar, bass, background vocals
Abraham Sirinix – harmonica, trombone, percussion, background vocals
Twist – trumpet, percussion
L'Ami Ro – piano, percussion, background vocals
Gaby – drums, percussion
Iza, Juanita, Julo, Nono – background vocals

Charts

References

External links
 Sound clips and lyrics translations
 Other reviews

1988 debut albums
Les Négresses Vertes albums
Virgin Records albums
Sire Records albums